Chaetodontoplus is a genus of marine angelfishes in the family Pomacanthidae. The are found in the Indo-Pacific region.

Species

References
 

Pomacanthidae
Marine fish genera
Taxa named by Pieter Bleeker